{{DISPLAYTITLE:C15H13NO4}}
The molecular formula C15H13NO4 (molar mass: 271.24 g/mol, exact mass: 271.0845 u) may refer to:

 Acetaminosalol
 Darienine

Molecular formulas